The Batesville mine is a mine located in the midsouth of the United States in Arkansas. Batesville represents one of the largest manganese reserve in the United States having estimated reserves of 178 million tonnes of manganese ore grading 4% manganese metal.

References 

Manganese mines in the United States
Companies based in Arkansas
Mining in Arkansas